"Clap Your Hands" is a song by French DJ and record producer David Guetta and Dutch electronic music duo GLOWINTHEDARK. The song was released as a digital download on 2 October 2015. The song peaked at number 166 on the French Singles Chart. The song was written by David Guetta, Giorgio Tuinfort, Martin Garrix, Thomas Leithead-Docherty and Albert Budhai, it is included on the 2015 re-release of Guetta's sixth studio album, entitled Listen Again.

Chart performance

Release history

References

2015 singles
2014 songs
David Guetta songs
Songs written by David Guetta
Songs written by Giorgio Tuinfort
Songs written by Martin Garrix
Parlophone singles
Song recordings produced by David Guetta